The 90th New York Infantry Regiment, the "Hancock Guard", "McClellan Chasseurs", "McClellan Rifles", was an infantry regiment of the Union Army during the American Civil War.

Service
The companies were recruited principally:
 A, B, and C at New York City;
 D at Clyde;
 E at Unadilla, Nineveh, and Otego;
 F, G, H, I, and K at Brooklyn and elsewhere;
 Second B at Norwich;
 Second H at Chautauqua County, and
 Second I at Medina, Ridgway, and Shelby.

It left on January 5, 1862, for Key West, Florida. In June 1862, the regiment was under the command of Lt. Col. Louis W. Tinelli at Fort Jefferson, Florida.

Early in 1863 it joined the XIX Corps in Louisiana. The regiment moved to Port Hudson, Louisiana, Bayou Lafourche from New Orleans. and the Red River. The veterans took leave in August and September, 1864, and those not on leave went with the 160th New York Volunteer Infantry. The regiment was ordered to Virginia and joined the Union Army of the Shenandoah fighting against Gen. Jubal Early. Soldiers who didn't reenlist left in December, 1864. The regiment was consolidated into six companies, which received members of the 114th, 116th and 133rd New York Volunteer Infantry. The regiment served in William Dwight's division at Washington, and at Savannah, Georgia. It was then ordered to Hawkinsville, Georgia, and mustered out at Savannah.

Total strength and casualties
During its service the regiment lost by death, killed in action, 2 officers, 33 enlisted men; of wounds received in action, 25 enlisted men; of disease and other causes, 8 officers, 183 enlisted men; total, 10 officers, 241 enlisted men; aggregate, 251; of whom 14 enlisted men died in the hands of the enemy.

Commanders
Colonel Joseph S. Morgan
 Colonel Nelson Shaurman
 Lieutenant Colonel Lewis W. Tinelli

See also

List of New York Civil War regiments

Notes

References
The Civil War Archive

External links
New York State Military Museum Unit History Project New York State Military Museum and Veterans Research Center - Civil War - 90th Infantry Regiment History, photographs, table of battles and casualties, and historical sketch for the 90th New York Infantry Regiment.

Infantry 090
1861 establishments in New York (state)
Military units and formations established in 1861
Military units and formations disestablished in 1866